Love on Line (LOL) is a 2009 Filipino comedy film produced by OctoArts Films and M-Zet Productions, directed by Tony Y. Reyes.

Plot
The story starts in a futuristic Manila, where 2 old men bicker against each other on their pasts. Samson (Vic Sotto) is Delilah's (Gina Pareño) son, while Tot (Jose Manalo) is a helper on the house that is a spoiled brat, much to Samson's anger. Back in time....

Tot usually sets him up on blind dates, with disastrous results, starting with a fat woman. He chains Tot and regularly threatens him with a hammer if he doesn't kiss the dog in front of him. Then when Delilah contracts a disease, which only Tot has the same blood type with her, Samson was forced again to go with the helper's scheme. He was set up again by Tot, using his face on the chat and online dating site. Angry, Samson chains Tot once again, forcing the latter to act like a dog.

Bunny (Manilyn Reynes), a regular in the dating site, uses her Thai cousin Paula's (Paula Taylor) picture to get known, which the latter consented. When the time for the eyeball, the real ones shocked when their proxies met, leading for Tot and Bunny to be jealous on their respective proxies and Tot to cast a curse that Delilah told him about, switching their personalities in 3 hours cycle, without cure to dispel the curse. Cursed, Tot got Samson's body, doing debauchery while in Samson's body, while Samson, trapped in Tot's body could do nothing but curse him.

Until one day, Samson tried to explain what happened, when Tot kisses her (using Samson's body), much to the former's anger and the girl walks out in sadness and anger. Tot is once again chained in the water tank, only released when he promised that he will tell the truth. They told the truth about the curse and they are reconciled, only for the curse to activate again. Don Pedro returns the land title he bought from Delilah's husband, whom he hated so much, proving his love for Delilah outbalances his hatred for Delilah's husband.

Back in the present, Tot and Samson swapped bodies again, the latter chasing the former out with a crutch as a weapon.

Cast
Vic Sotto as Samson Alumpihit, Jr.
Paula Taylor as Paula Taylor
Gina Pareño as Delilah Alumpihit
Manilyn Reynes as Roberta "Bunny" Polistico
Leo Martinez as Don Pedro Polistico
Jose Manalo as Totonio "Tot" Baklaba
Matt Evans as Danie
Melissa Ricks as Lizzie
Wally Bayola as Bok
Richie D'Horsie as Oxo/XO
Danielle Castaño as Cleo
Led Sobrepeña III as Butler 
Mitoy Yonting as Driver
 Ricky Davao as Attorney

Soundtrack
The film used the song Believe In Me by Thor as its Original Soundtrack.

References

External links

2009 comedy films
2009 films
OctoArts Films films
APT Entertainment films
M-Zet Productions films
Philippine comedy films
Films directed by Tony Y. Reyes